Marquette Township is the name of some places in the U.S. state of Michigan:

 Marquette Township, Mackinac County, Michigan
 Marquette Township, Marquette County, Michigan

See also 
 Marquette, Michigan, a city in Marquette County

Michigan township disambiguation pages